The 2013 Chinese Football Association Division Two League season is the 24th season since its establishment in 1989. It is divided into two groups, North and South. There are 15 teams participating in the league, 8 teams in North Group and 7 teams in South Group. The league is made up of two stages, the group stage and the play-off. The group stage is a double round-robin format. Each team in the group will play the other teams twice, home and away. It will start on May 4 and end on September 22. The play-off stage is a two-legged elimination. It will start in October 8. At the end of the season, the two finalists of the play-off will qualify for promotion to 2014 China League One.

Team changes

Promotion and relegation 
Guizhou Zhicheng as the 2012 season champion and Hubei China-Kyle as runner-up earned promotion to the 2013 China League One.

Hohhot Dongjin were relegated from 2012 China League One to 2013 China League Two North Group as the last placed team.

Name changes

North Group 
Hohhot Dongjin relocated to Shenyang during the season (in July 2013) and changed its name back to Shenyang Dongjin.

South Group 
Dongguan Nancheng relocated to Mei County on December 12, 2012 and changed its name to Meixian Hakka.
Kunming Ruilong relocated to Dali and changed its name to Dali Ruilong.

New entries 
There are six new teams participating in 2013 China League Two. They are Gansu Aoxin, Liaoning Youth, Qingdao Hainiu, Shandong Tengding, Lijiang Jiayunhao and Meizhou Kejia.

Clubs

Group stage standings

North Group

South Group

Group stage results

North Group

South Group

Play-offs

Quarter-finals

First leg

Second leg

Semi-finals

First leg

Second leg

Third-Place Match

Final Match

Top scorers

References

External links
Official site 
News and results at Sohu.com 

3
China League Two seasons